Pseudohemihyalea edwardsii, or Edwards' glassy-wing, is a moth in the family Erebidae. It was described by Alpheus Spring Packard in 1864. It is found in the United States from western Oregon and the Columbia Gorge in southern Washington south to California, in the south-west east to western New Mexico. The habitat consists of oak woodlands and mixed hardwood forests at low elevations.

The length of the forewings is 27–31 mm. The forewings are translucent ocher yellow with a dusting of dark brown scales. The hindwings are translucent gray yellow with a rose flush medially and at the anal angle. Adults are on wing from late August to early October in one generation per year.

The larvae feed on Quercus species, including Q. garryana and Q. chrysolepis. They are densely covered with long hairs. These are black dorsally and reddish brown laterally. There are also sparse long white hairs.

Etymology
The species is named in honor of actor-entomologist Henry Edwards.

References

Moths described in 1864
edwardsii